In Light Syrup is an album of B-sides and rare tracks by American alternative rock band Toad the Wet Sprocket, released in 1995. In Light Syrup was RIAA Certified Gold on June 4, 2001. This album includes the hit single "Good Intentions".

Track listing

References

Toad the Wet Sprocket albums
B-side compilation albums
1995 compilation albums
Columbia Records compilation albums
Folk rock albums